Yelena Ryabova (Елена Рябова, born November 3, 1990) is a Turkmenistan short-distance runner. She will compete for the women's 100 metres in the 2016 Summer Olympics.

International competitions

References

External links

Living people
1990 births
Turkmenistan female sprinters
Athletes (track and field) at the 2010 Asian Games
World Athletics Championships athletes for Turkmenistan
Olympic athletes of Turkmenistan
Athletes (track and field) at the 2016 Summer Olympics
Asian Games competitors for Turkmenistan
21st-century Turkmenistan women